Heat shock 70 kDa protein 4 is a protein that in humans is encoded by the HSPA4 gene.

The protein encoded by this gene was originally suggested to be a member of the heat shock protein 70 family.  However it is now known that human HSPA4 is an equivalent to mouse the Apg-2 protein and is a member of the Hsp110 family.

Interactions 

HSPA4 has been shown to interact with:

 APAF1 
 DNAJB1,
 HDAC1, 
 HSF1, 
 HSPBP1, 
 Histone deacetylase 2, 
 NAD(P)H dehydrogenase (quinone 1), 
 STUB1,  and
 TTC1.

References

Further reading

External links 
 

Heat shock proteins